The Valée system (French:"Système Valée") was an artillery system developed between 1825 and 1831 by the French artillery officer Sylvain Charles Valée, and officially adopted by the French Army from 1828.

Specifications

The Valée system consisted in various technical improvements to the Gribeauval system and Napoleon I's Year XI system. The system mainly improved the mobility of the artillery train, and simplified maintenance by standardizing limber usage and wheel size, and reducing the number of carriage types to two. It also allowed for cannoniers to be able to sit on the ammunition chests of the battery itself during transportation, allowing the whole artillery train to move as fast as the infantry or cavalry.

Valée also improved the guns themselves slightly, by making them lighter, and with a longer range.

The complete Valée system consisted in siege guns of 24 and 16 pounds (French pounds), and field guns of 12 and 8 pounds. It also included field howitzers of 24 pounds and 6 inches (Obusier de 15 cm), and a siege howitzer of 8 inches. Mountain artillery pieces were of 12 pound caliber. Mortars were of 12, 10 and 8 inches, with a 15 inches stone mortar.

Deployment

 
French artillery would be reorganized along the Valee system in 1827. The "Valée system" would be used at the Capture of Alger (1830) and the Fall of Constantine (1837), as well as during the Crimea War (1853-1856).

An American version of the Valee system was also developed. Some pieces are visible at the Concord Battery, Concord, Massachusetts.

A new generation of weapons would emerge in shell-firing canon obusiers, with the invention of the naval shell-gun by Paixhans in 1823, and the introduction of the canon obusier de 12 in 1853 by the French Army, which would render the Valée system obsolete.

See also

Notes

Artillery of France